Dali  is a Syrian village located in Al-Hamraa Nahiyah in Hama District, Hama.  According to the Syria Central Bureau of Statistics (CBS), Dalleh had a population of 535 in the 2004 census. During Syria civil war, Dalleh was captured by ISIS, then SAA captured this town on 6 February 2018.

References 

Populated places in Hama District